Line 6 is an eastern north–south line of the Shanghai Metro network. It opened on December 29, 2007. The entire line is located in the Pudong New Area. A complete trip between the two end terminals,  and  takes approximately 1 hour and 10 minutes. Line 6 has been dubbed the unofficial nickname “Hello Kitty Line” due to its lurid pink livery. The line is colored magenta on system maps.

History

Controversy
Like the Lexington Avenue Subway in New York City, passenger traffic has consistently exceeded the designed capacity of the line since its opening and causes severe strain to the services. The planning of Line 6 began in 2000, but real estate development along the proposed line happened faster than anticipated upon the line's initial opening. Uniquely at the time, a majority of the Line 6 opened in one phase creating a 30 kilometer long corridor overnight. Existing buses were cancelled or diverted simultaneously due to the opening of Line 6, forcing residents along the line to travel by rail transit. This was exacerbated by high initial train headways upon opening as all ordered rolling stock have not been completely delivered. Additionally, the line had relatively short operating hours leading to large number of passengers flooding into the first train. Line 6 was initially forecasted to carry 105,000 people/day. However the aforementioned factors led to the ridership of the line to exceed 150,000 people/day during the first few days of operation. Realizing the sheer miscalculation during construction, the municipal government have pledged to add new trains and shorten wait times starting in June 2008. However, Line 6 still suffers severe crowding and delays especially during rush hours with passenger flow growing faster than expected. In 2012 the busiest section of the line was still running at 133% capacity. With the opening of Line 12 the Shanghai Metro advises passengers divert to the new line to relieve crowding. The line was built to accommodate light metro narrow-bodied "C size" trains with 4 carriages each, which is not interchangeable with wide-body "A size" trains with 6 to 8 carriages on other Shanghai Metro lines. This difference in loading gauge has made it impractical to upgrade the line to higher capacity "A size" trains to relieve demand. The platform length (especially at underground stations) has made it impractical to upgrade the line to accommodate more carriages.

Stations

Service routes

Important stations
Century Avenue is an interchange with lines 2, 4 and 9.
Lancun Road is an interchange with line 4.
West Gaoke Road is an interchange with line 7.
Oriental Sports Center, the final station of line 6, opened in April 2011. It is an interchange with lines 8 and 11.
Jufeng Road is an interchange with line 12.
Dongming Road is an interchange with line 13.
Gangcheng Road, the other terminal station of line 6, interchange with line 10.
Yunshan Road is an interchange with line 14.

Future expansion
There are no plans to extend the line.

Station name change
 On 28 October 2006, Dongfang Road was renamed as the  after station renovation for line 2 and the opening of line 4 (before line 6 began serving the station).
 On May 7, 2011, Jiyang Road was renamed .

Headways 
<onlyinclude>
<onlyinclude>
<onlyinclude>

Technology

Signalling

Rolling Stock
The designed speed of the train is 80 km/h, the length (Type A carriages are longer at 23 meters) is 19.49 meters (Tc)/19.44 meters (Mp, M), and the width (Type A carriages are wider at 3.0 meters) is 2.6 meters.

References 

Shanghai Metro lines
 
Railway lines opened in 2007
2007 establishments in China